Hydrolycus armatus is a species of dogtooth characin found in freshwater of tropical South America. It is sometimes known as the payara, a name it shares with the related H. scomberoides.

This predatory fish occasionally makes its way into the aquarium trade, but it requires a very large tank. In its native range it is considered a major gamefish.

Distribution and habitat
This species of fish is found in the Amazon, Orinoco and Essequibo basins in tropical South America. They are found in several different freshwater habitats, but often in fast-flowing water. They are typically found in deeper waters during the day. The species is locally common; in a major study of a Venezuelan floodplain river,  of the collected fish were H. armatus, and the species was particularly common in creeks and lagoons. At least some populations are migratory.

Description
Hydrolycus armatus are overall silvery. In adults the base of the tail and anal fin is pale yellowish, and the distal part is blackish, contrasting with a narrow white edge at the very tip (unique among Hydrolycus species).

It has frequently been confused with the generally smaller H. scomberoides. Like other dogtooth characins, it has very long pointed canine teeth. In H. armatus these can surpass  in length in large individuals. These are used for spearing their prey, usually other fish.

References

Cynodontidae
Freshwater fish of Brazil
Freshwater fish of Colombia
Fish of Guyana
Fish of Venezuela
Fish of the Amazon basin
Taxa named by Sir William Jardine
Fish described in 1841